Pinzon or Pinzón may refer to: 
Pinzón, Buenos Aires, a settlement in Pergamino Partido, in Argentina
Pinzon (trademark), a private label for a product line of Amazon.com
Pinzón (surname), people with the surname Pinzón

See also
The Pinzón Brothers
Pinzón Island
Finch, of which several species are named "Pinzón" in Spanish